A "friends of" is type of not-for-profit society created solely to support some other organization or enterprise, typically through fundraising, lobbying, and publicity.  They are very common in the galleries, libraries, archives, and museums (GLAM) sector.  They have a long history going back to the 19th century, particularly in Western Europe.

The first know friends of a museum society is the Vorarlberger Landesmuseumverein of Austria, set up in 1857.  Other early examples include the 
Société des amis des monuments parisiens ("Friends of Parisien Monuments", 1885), the Société des amis des monuments rouennais ("Friends of Rouennais Monuments", founded 1886), and the Société des amis du Louvre ("Friends of the Louvre", founded 1897), the later of which became so popular that it has an American counterpart, the American Friends of the Louvre, based in New York.

World Federation of the Friends of Museums 
The World Federation of Friends of Museums was conceived in 1967 by Luis Monreal, the then-curator of the Barcelona Museums (1965–1974) and later the secretary general of the International Council of Museums (1974–1985).  The Barcelona Friends invited friends groups from around the world to meet in Barcelona in 1972 to coincide with their 40th anniversary.  They agreed to create a global federation that would hold world congresses every three years.  The first world congress was held in 1975 in Brussels.  Subsequent hosts have been, 
 1978 | Florence, Italy 
 1981 | Birmingham, U.K.
 1984 | Paris, France 
 1987 | Toronto, Canada 
 1990 | Cordoba, Spain 
 1993 | Treviso, Italy 
 1996 | Oaxaca, Mexico
 1999 | Sydney, Australia                            
 2002 | Buenos Aires, Argentina             
 2005 | Sevilla, Spain                                  
 2008 | Jerusalem, Israel                              
 2011 | Genoa, Italy                                  
 2014 | Berlin, Germany                                       
 2017 | Verona, Italy 
 2019 | Montreal, Canada
 2022 | Marseilles, France

Member organization include 18 national friends federations, 27 associate members (friends groups outside of a national federation).

References

Society